Holy Cross Girls' High School is a Catholic primary and secondary school for girls, located at Tejgaon in Dhaka, Bangladesh. It serves students from class 1 through class 10. Although run by the Roman Catholic Church, the school is open to students of all religions.

History
The Sisters of the Holy Cross started Holy Cross Girls' High School near the Holy Rosary Church in 1951 as a kindergarten with two students. The next year it became a primary school. Later it was accredited by the Dhaka Board of Intermediate and Secondary Education as a secondary school serving students through class 10. The first batch of students from the school sat their Secondary School Certificate (SSC) examinations in 1966. By that time, the school had humanities and science sections. It opened a commerce section in 1999.

Extracurricular activities
Students take part in quiz recitation, debate club, arts and crafts competitions, girl guides, and girl scouts. There is a science fair every other year.

Awards and recognition
The school won the Ministry of Education's 'Best National School' prize twice, in 1997 and 2003. In other years the Ministry has ranked it among the top ten schools in Dhaka.

See also
Notre Dame University Bangladesh
Holy Cross College, Dhaka
St. Joseph Higher Secondary School

References

Christianity in Dhaka
Schools in Dhaka District
Holy Cross secondary schools
Catholic secondary schools in Bangladesh
Girls' schools in Bangladesh
Educational institutions established in 1951
1951 establishments in East Pakistan